JFHS may refer to:
 James Fallon High School, Albury, New South Wales, Australia
 Jefferson Forest High School, Forest, Virginia, United States
 Joondalup Family Health Study